Ichthyophis bernisi, the Indonesia caecilian or Indonesian caecilian, is a species of amphibian in the family Ichthyophiidae. It is endemic to Java (Indonesia). It is only known from the holotype collected from an unspecified location on Java before 1975. The specific name bernisi honors , a Spanish ornithologist.

Description
The holotype measures  in total length, including the 2.7-mm tail. The total number of annuli (both primary and secondary) is 298. The eyes are visible. The general coloration is light sienna. A yellowish band runs on the sides, beginning at the second collar and fading on the belly.

Habitat and consevartion
There is no specific information on ecology of this species. It is assumed to inhabit tropical rainforest and be oviparous, laying terrestrial eggs that develop into aquatic larvae. There is no information on possible threats to this species.

References

bernisi
Amphibians of Indonesia
Endemic fauna of Java
Amphibians described in 1975
Taxonomy articles created by Polbot